Hegar may refer to:
Hegar's sign
Hegar dilator
Hegar (surname)